Alexander Sergeevich Nikulin (born August 25, 1985) is a Russian professional ice hockey player. Nikulin is currently playing with TUTO Hockey in the Finnish Mestis.

Playing career
Alexander turned professional with HC CSKA Moscow of the Russian Super League in 2004. After playing three seasons with CSKA, Alexander signed with the Ottawa Senators who had drafted him 122nd overall in the 2004 NHL Entry Draft. Nikulin played his first NHL game for the Ottawa Senators on November 22, 2007 against the Pittsburgh Penguins.

In the 2008–09 season Nikulin was assigned to the Binghamton Senators of the AHL. Disappointed with his slow progress to the NHL with the Senators, Nikulin demanded a trade or voiced the possibility of returning to Russia. On November 3, 2008, Nikulin was traded to the Phoenix Coyotes for Drew Fata. Nikulin was then assigned to affiliate, the San Antonio Rampage, where he spent the majority of the season, only playing in a single game with the Coyotes.

On May 24, 2009, failing an adaption to the North American style, Nikulin signed with former team CSKA Moscow of the KHL for the 2009-10 season.

During the 2014–15 season, Nikulin's third stint with CSKA was cut short to 5 scoreless games after he was waived and claimed by Neftekhimik Nizhnekamsk on October 29, 2014.

On July 5, 2015, Nikulin continued his career in the KHL, signing a contract with HC Lada Togliatti.

Personal
While with the Senators, Nikulin maintained a blog of his transition to North America, that became popular due to its candour.

Career statistics

Regular season and playoffs

International

References

External links

Alexander Nikulin's blog

1985 births
Living people
Amur Khabarovsk players
Binghamton Senators players
HC CSKA Moscow players
HC Lada Togliatti players
MHk 32 Liptovský Mikuláš players
HC Neftekhimik Nizhnekamsk players
Ottawa Senators draft picks
Ottawa Senators players
Sportspeople from Perm, Russia
Phoenix Coyotes players
Russian ice hockey centres
San Antonio Rampage players
HC Sibir Novosibirsk players
HC Spartak Moscow players
TuTo players
HC Vityaz players
Russian expatriate sportspeople in the United States
Russian expatriate sportspeople in Canada
Russian expatriate sportspeople in the Czech Republic
Russian expatriate sportspeople in Finland
Russian expatriate sportspeople in Slovakia
Russian expatriate sportspeople in France
Expatriate ice hockey players in the United States
Expatriate ice hockey players in Canada
Expatriate ice hockey players in the Czech Republic
Expatriate ice hockey players in Finland
Expatriate ice hockey players in Slovakia
Expatriate ice hockey players in France
Russian expatriate ice hockey people